Tam's Gold Seal Drugs (later Tam's Rexall Drugs) was a chain of drugs stores founded in Warren, Indiana, United States, in 1932. The chain was founded by Merritt Tam and was run by the Tam family until the chain was liquidated.

Stores were located in Warren, Huntington, Marion, Anderson, Hartford City, Fort Wayne, Edgewood and Elwood, Indiana.

References

History of Huntington County, Indiana

Defunct pharmacies of the United States
Defunct companies based in Indiana
Health care companies based in Indiana